The Northwest Tri-County Intermediate Unit, also known as IU5, is one of the 29 intermediate units in Pennsylvania. This regional educational service agency was created by the state's General Assembly in 1971, and is headquartered in Edinboro, Pa. The unit serves 
Crawford,
Erie, and
Warren counties.

External links

Education in Crawford County, Pennsylvania
Education in Erie County, Pennsylvania
Education in Warren County, Pennsylvania
Intermediate Units in Pennsylvania